The Gouzenko Affair was the name given to events in Canada surrounding the defection of Igor Gouzenko from the Soviet Union in 1945 and his subsequent allegations regarding the existence of a Soviet spy ring of Canadian Communists. Gouzenko's defection and revelations are considered by historians to have marked the beginning of the Cold War in Canada, as well as potentially setting the stage for the "Red Scare" of the 1950s.

The Kellock–Taschereau Commission (officially the Royal Commission to Investigate the Facts Relating to and the Circumstances Surrounding the Communication, by Public Officials and Other Persons in Positions of Trust of Secret and Confidential Information to Agents of a Foreign Power) was a royal commission that began in 1946 with the mandate to investigate the veracity of Gouzenko's information. The Commission was appointed by Prime Minister William Lyon Mackenzie King on behalf of the Government of Canada under Order in Council PC 411 on 5 February 1946. It was headed by two judges of the Supreme Court of Canada, Justice Robert Taschereau and Justice Roy Kellock. Counsel included President of the Canadian Bar Association E.K. Williams, D.W. Mundell, Gérald Fauteux, and John Robert Cartwright.

Gouzenko's information led to a sweeping investigation and arrests under the War Measures Act of 21 Canadians, along with 11 convictions. Among them was the Labor-Progressive Party Member of Parliament for Cartier, Fred Rose, the only Communist ever elected to Parliament. Other notable people among those accused of passing over secrets were Canadian Army Captain Gordon Lunan, and Sam Carr, a senior organizer of the Labor-Progressive Party.

The proceedings of the Commission have been placed alongside the October Crisis of 1970 as the most extensive abuse of individual rights in Canadian history during peacetime. The controversy surrounding the Gouzenko Affair ultimately led to the formation of several civil liberties organizations.

Filling 6,000 pages, Gouzenko's testimony was not made public until 1981.

History

Defection and documents 
On 5 September 1945, just following the end of the Second World War, a Russian cipher clerk named Igor Gouzenko (along with his child and pregnant wife) fled the Soviet Embassy in Ottawa with 109 documents that proved the existence of a Soviet spy ring in Canada, wherein Canadian Communists were spying on Canada, Great Britain, and the United States, and handing over secret information to the Soviet Union.

According to the documents, the Soviet Embassy was housing several spies, connected to agents in Montreal, the United States, and the United Kingdom who had been providing Moscow with classified information. This caused a potentially dangerous international crisis, as Canadians targeted by Soviet espionage worked in sensitive positions; they were privy to diplomatic, scientific, and military secrets—including highly classified information regarding research on radar, code-breaking, and the atomic bomb. Furthermore, Gouzenko warned that the Soviets were not allies but were planning world domination.

Pre-Commission action 
Gouzenko took his documents to the Ottawa Journal, but the night editor told him to go to the police. He also unsuccessfully sought help from Ottawa Magistrate’s Court. Minister of Justice Louis St. Laurent (who later became Prime Minister), keeping in mind Canada's amicable relations with the Soviet Union, would not meet with him until his claims were checked out. The RCMP simply assigned 2 agents to watch Gouzenko's apartment; however, fearing for his life, he opted to hide out at a neighbour's apartment.

Gouzenko was finally taken seriously after four men from the Soviet Embassy broke into his apartment, on September 6, looking for him and his documents. On September 7, Gouzenko and his family were granted asylum; within weeks, they were taken by RCMP officers into protective custody and were kept for months in a secret location in Camp X, a top-secret spy training school near Whitby, Ontario, while the claims were verified.

While Gouzenko was interrogated at RCMP headquarters, his documents were being translated. They revealed the existence of a large-scale Soviet espionage system, which Norman Robertson (the undersecretary of state for the Department of External Affairs) said to be "much worse than we would have believed." The Soviet Embassy was evidently a home to several spies connected to agents in Montreal, the United States, and the United Kingdom, and had been providing the USSR with classified information ranging from ciphers to atomic research.

Prime Minister William Lyon Mackenzie King responded later that year by signing a top-secret Order-in-Council (PC6444) passed under the authority of the War Measures Act. The order directed St. Laurent to use whatever means necessary to investigate Gouzenko’s claim. Under the Act, the Minister of Justice had unlimited powers over the "arrest, detention and deportation" of any Canadian citizen, who could be held for an indefinite period. (There was no Canadian Bill of Rights until 1960, thus the government's ability to detain citizens was virtually unchecked.) It effectively suspended habeas corpus and empowered authorities to detain, interrogate, and prosecute suspected Communist spies.

In late 1945, Gouzenko’s defection still remained a secret; only a handful of high-level government officials were aware of the investigation and PC6444. On December 7, 1945, the government’s legal advisor, E.K. Williams, who would later go on to become Chief Justice of the Supreme Court of Manitoba, sent King a top-secret memorandum advising that the evidence provided by Gouzenko (now code-named Corby) was sufficient to prosecute perhaps only four of the suspected spies. Rather, he suggested the creation of a royal commission that would have "full control over its own procedure... It need not be bound by the ordinary rules of evidence if it considers it desirable to disregard them. It need not permit counsel to appear for those to be interrogated by or before it."

Kellock–Taschereau Commission 

The discussion over what to do about Gouzenko's revelations came to an abrupt halt on February 3, 1946, when Drew Pearson, an NBC Radio host, announced that a Soviet agent had surrendered to Canadian authorities and that Canada was quietly investigating a Soviet spy ring that extended into the United States government. The most likely source of the leak was J. Edgar Hoover, as it was not uncommon for the FBI to leak information about suspected communists to the press and the two men corresponded often. Furthermore, an internal FBI memorandum revealed that Hoover had spoken with Pearson by telephone earlier that day.

On February 5, King hurriedly signed another Order-in-Council (PC 411), this time appointing on behalf of the Government of Canada a royal commission chaired by Supreme Court Justices Roy Kellock and Robert Taschereau. The Kellock–Taschereau Commission (officially called the Royal Commission to Investigate the Facts Relating to and the Circumstances Surrounding the Communication, by Public Officials and Other Persons in Positions of Trust of Secret and Confidential Information to Agents of a Foreign Power) was mandated to investigate Gouzenko’s information and to offer recommendations to protect the state against future acts of espionage.

The Commission first convened at the Seigniory Club in Montebello. There, on February 13, Gouzenko was sworn in and began to give his testimony. The first Canadian he identified as a spy was the Labor-Progressive Member of Parliament for Cartier, Fred Rose, the only Communist ever elected to Parliament. Another notable person named by Gouzenko was Sam Carr, a senior organizer of the Labor-Progressive Party. By the end of the second day, the Commission had the names of 15 suspected spies.

Soon after Gouzenko began delivering his testimony, the Commission decided that 14 of the individuals identified by Gouzenko (the Commission was reluctant to arrest Rose) should be detained and isolated. On February 10, Pearson had again brought up the espionage case in his weekly radio broadcast and the Commission feared that the suspects might attempt to run. Indeed, Carr had already fled to the United States. In a February 13 memo to MI6, one of the investigators, Peter Dwyer, noted that, "Royal Commissioners suddenly decided today to prevent any further damage by leaks from Drew Pearson by taking action before his next Sunday broadcast."

Most of the alleged spies resided in Ottawa or Montreal. However, one of the suspects, Gordon Lunan, was stationed in London as a speech writer for Paul Martin Sr., King's Secretary of State for External Affairs. On February 13, Lunan was sent a cable recalling him to Canada under the pretense that he was being promoted. Lunan was scheduled to arrive at Montreal's Dorval Airport on February 15 so it was that date that was selected for rounding up the suspected spies.

Early on the morning of February 15, ten days after the Commission was established, the RCMP launched a series of raids and detained 11 suspected spies. Hours later, King called a press conference in Ottawa and made his first public statement regarding the Gouzenko Affair. He did not mention Gouzenko or the Soviet Union; rather, he said only that secret information had been disclosed to a foreign government and that several people had been detained. The following day, February 16, two additional suspects were arrested.

The 13 detainees were sequestered and questioned by the police for weeks. Denied access to legal counsel, they were held in small cells, kept under suicide watch, and guarded at all times.

The Canadian government revealed in February 1946 that it had given political asylum to Igor Gouzenko.

In total, 21 Canadians were arrested, along with 11 convicted. Also implicated by Gouzenko’s documents was E. Herbert Norman, an External Affairs official who was hotly pursued by American officers; Lester B. Pearson, then-Secretary of State for External Affairs (and later Prime Minister), ardently protected Norman. Gouzenko maintained that Pearson had Communist leanings, an allegation supported by Elizabeth Bentley, a Soviet double agent who later withdrew her testimony.

Evidence before the commissioners suggested at least two Soviet espionage networks were active in Canada in wartime, one targeting the Manhattan Project.

Arrests 

In total, 21 suspected spies were arrested as a result of Gouzenko's revelations. Of the 20 Canadians arrested, ten were convicted and received punishments ranging from a CA$500 fine to six years' imprisonment. British nuclear scientist Alan Nunn May was arrested in England in March 1946 and pleaded guilty.

Convicted 

 Raymond Boyer: An assistant professor of chemistry at McGill University, Boyer passed on information regarding Canadian work on chemical explosives, namely RDX. He was sentenced to two years' imprisonment.
 Sam Carr: According to the documents provided by Gouzenko, Carr acted as a recruiting agent for the GRU and aided a Russian agent named Ignacy Witczak in obtaining a false passport. He fled to the United States where he lived under the alias, "Jack Lewis." He was arrested in New York City in January 1949 and extradited to Canada where he was charged with conspiracy to obtain a false passport. He was convicted and sentenced to six years in prison.
 Harold Gerson: Gerson was a geological engineer with the Department of Munitions and Supply, a crown corporation that produced explosives. He passed on information regarding the testing of projectiles. He was initially sentenced to five years' imprisonment; however, his conviction was overturned on appeal. He was convicted at a new trial and sentenced to four years.
 Gordon Lunan: Lunan was an editor with the Wartime Information Board.  He acted as a recruiting agent and attempted to enlist other informants, soliciting whatever information he could and reporting back to Vasili Rogov, an assistant military attaché at the Soviet Embassy. He was convicted and sentenced to five years in prison.
 Alan Nunn May: A British physicist who had worked with the National Research Council (NRC) in Montreal since 1943, Nunn May passed on information regarding his research on uranium. Most notably, he supplied the Soviets with a small sample of enriched uranium-233. He was arrested in the United Kingdom, pleaded guilty, and, in May 1946, was sentenced to ten years' hard labour.
 Edward Mazerall: An electrical engineer with the NRC, Mazerall leaked two research reports on air navigation. He was tried by jury and sentenced to four years in prison. 
 Fred Rose: A Polish-born Member of Parliament, Rose was a recruiter for the Soviets and acted as a go-between for many of the accused spies. He was arrested on March 14, 1946 and charged with conspiring to provide secret information about RDX. He was convicted by a jury in June 1946 and sentenced to six years in prison. He was expelled from the House of Commons in 1947 and his Canadian citizenship was revoked in 1957.
 Philip Durnford Smith: An electrical engineer with the NRC, Smith passed on material on radar systems, radio tubes, and microwaves. Smith was convicted in Ottawa and sentenced to five years' imprisonment.
 John Soboloff: Soboloff was a Toronto physician who was charged with falsely attesting to know Witczak in order to help him procure a passport. He was convicted and fined CA$500.
 Kathleen Willsher: Willsher was a secretary at the office of the British High Commissioner, Malcolm MacDonald. The only evidence implicating her in the affair was a set of leaked letters that the Soviets had mistakenly attributed to her and that she would not have had access to. However, while under interrogation, she confessed that she verbally communicated general information to the Canadian Communist Party. She pleaded guilty and was sentenced to three years.
 Emma Woikin: A cipher clerk at the Department of External Affairs, Woikin passed on several secret diplomatic cables to a contact at the Soviet Embassy. She pleaded guilty and was sentenced to two-and-a-half years plus an additional six months for contempt of court.

Acquitted 

 Eric Adams: Adams was an economist with the Bank of Canada. He was identified by Gouzenko as a spy code-named "Ernst" who, in late 1944, passed along information regarding the dispatch of munitions to the United Kingdom and whom Gouzenko described as a Jewish employee of the Bank of Canada. However, Adams was not Jewish and was working at the Canadian Industrial Development Bank at that time. Furthermore, Adams was not involved with any military committee, either at the Canadian Industrial Development Bank or the Bank of Canada. He was nevertheless arrested and tried by jury. He was acquitted on October 22, 1946, but his career was ruined and he found himself unemployable.
 James Scotland "Scott" Benning: An employee of the Department of Munitions and Supply, Benning was accused of passing on an assortment of information. He was convicted on October 29, 1946 and sentenced to five years' imprisonment. His conviction was overturned on appeal in April 1947.
 Agatha Chapman: An economist for the Dominion Bureau of Statistics, Chapman belonged to a number of socialist study groups and had connections to most of the accused. She was not mentioned in any of the documents provided by Gouzenko, but Willsher claimed she was a GRU contact and she was arrested. She was acquitted on November 27, 1946, but she found herself ostracized from the civil service and left Canada for several years. She committed suicide in 1963.
 Israel Halperin: Halperin was a mathematics professor at Queen's University who had taken leave to serve in the Canadian Artillery during the Second World War. He was mentioned in four of the reports Lunan submitted to Rogov. Although Lunan never cited him as a source of any secret information, Halperin was nonetheless charged and tried. He was acquitted on March 24, 1947 due to lack of evidence.
 Henry Harris: Harris was a Toronto optometrist who was charged with procuring a false passport for Witczak. He was convicted on January 27, 1947 and sentenced to five years, but his conviction was overturned on appeal on May 27.
 Matt Nightingale: Nightingale had served a telephone specialist with the Royal Canadian Air Force (RCAF). He admitted to meeting with Rogov, but there is no indication he had passed on any information. He was tried by jury and acquitted on November 7, 1946.
 William Pappin: A clerk in the passport office at the Department of External Affairs, Pappin was accused of tampering with records in order to help procure a passport for Witczak. He was charged with conspiring to obtain a false passport, but he was acquitted on October 18, 1946 when the only witness admitted she had "given an untrue statement" to the Commission.
 Frederick Poland: Poland had been a squadron leader in the RCAF before transferring to the Wartime Information Board in 1944. One of the documents provided by Gouzenko – a notebook belonging to the military attaché to the Soviet Embassy, Colonel Nikolai Zabotin – made a partially illegible reference to a "Holland" or "Polland," a Toronto-based RCAF officer who had passed along a map of training schools in the area. Given his communist leanings and the fact he had shared an Ottawa apartment with Lunan, investigators surmised that the individual was Poland, even though Poland had lived in Ottawa since 1942, a year before Zabotin was assigned there. Poland was acquitted on January 16, 1947, but was barred from working for the federal government.
 David Shugar: Shugar had worked as a radar specialist who specialized in submarine detection research for the Royal Canadian Navy. There is no indication Shugar had acted as an agent for the Soviet Union; rather, he had been identified as a potential recruit in what was effectively a GRU wish list. The charges against him were dropped at his preliminary hearing; however, they were later revived and he was tried in December 1946. He was acquitted on December 7, but he lost his job with the federal government. Finding himself blacklisted, he moved to France and, later, Poland. In 1957, the Government of Canada tried unsuccessfully to revoke his Canadian citizenship.

Charges withdrawn 

 Freda Linton: A secretary to the Commissioner of the National Film Board of Canada, John Grierson, Linton was mentioned in two of the documents provided by Gouzenko. Gouzenko also testified that she had given Zabotin "some materials." Although there was no evidence she had passed on any secret information, she was subpoenaed in May 1946 but could not be located. Three years later, she surrendered to police in Montreal. Her lawyer, Joseph Cohen, managed to get the charges dropped, but she lived under a false identity for the remainder of her life.

Aftermath 
The impact of the Kellock–Taschereau Commission was far-reaching, first because people implicated in Gouzenko's documents were secretly arrested and denied legal advice, under emergency wartime regulations, and an "Emergency Committee for Civil Rights" assembled to defend them. Executive members included C.B. Macpherson, Leopold Infeld, and A.Y. Jackson. Their advertisement in the Toronto Star said that the Commission endangered the "basic rights of Canadians" and did "violence to the rights of free men." They compared the Kellock–Taschereau Commission to the trial of Lt.-Col. John Lilburne during the English Civil War of 1649, stating "the methods of the Commission are not new. They were used against Englishmen in 1649 and against Canadians in 1946.

Whatever the implications for civil and legal rights, the "Gouzenko inquiry" provided the first judicial evidence in North America of proved Communist spies, among the first events of the Cold War, and prompted both increased investigation (which discovered such spies as Julius and Ethel Rosenberg) and McCarthyism. In the Literary Review of Canada, Margaret Atwood listed the report of the Kellock–Taschereau Commission as one of Canada's 100 most important books. Many later writers on espionage cite its evidence as the first detailed narratives of how Soviet agents cultivated sympathetic acquaintances so as to turn them into active spies on secret topics. Gordon Lunan, one of the spies most harshly punished (5 years in prison) later published personal memoirs.

In 1966, two decades after his defection, Gouzenko agreed to appear on live television for the first time, as a mystery guest on CBC's Front Page Challenge, wearing his signature bag over his head. Following his appearance, Gouzenko went on to opine on the activities of the Soviet Union; he spoke out on the Munsinger affair of 1966, as well as on the claims in 1981 that Roger Hollis, a high-ranking MI5 agent who interrogated Gouzenko in 1945, was actually a Soviet mole.

Filling 6,000 pages, Gouzenko's testimony was not made public until 1981.

In pop culture 
Films and series:

The Iron Curtain (1948) — a film based on the memoirs of Igor Gouzenko.
 Operation Manhunt (1954) — a film fictionalizing the aftermath of the defection of Gouzenko,
 On Guard For Thee (1981) — a 3-part CBC/NFB documentary series about Canada's national security operations and civil liberties; its first part, "The Most Dangerous Spy", focused on the Gouzenko Affair.

Television episodes:

 "Gouzenko defection exposes Soviet spy ring," Front Page Challenge, CBC Television (1958 February 16)
 "Igor Gouzenko on Seven Days," This Hour Has Seven Days, CBC Television (1966 March 13).

See also 

 Canada in the Cold War
 October Crisis
 Fred Rose (politician)
 List of Canadian Royal Commissions
 McCarthyism
 PROFUNC
 Soviet espionage in the United States

Notes

References

Citations

Works cited

Further reading 

 
 Cross, L.D. 2005. Spies in Our Midst: The Incredible Story of Igor Gouzenko, Cold War Spy.
 Gouzenko, Igor. This Was My Choice.
 Granatstein, J. L., and David Stafford. 1990. Spy Wars: Espionage and Canada from Gouzenko to Glasnost. .
 Herd, Alex. 2006 February 6. "Canada and the Cold War." The Canadian Encyclopedia (last edited 2021 March 6).
 Hristov, Alen. 2018 December 8. "The Gouzenko Affair and the Development of Canadian Intelligence." E-International Relations.
 Knight, Amy. 2005. How the Cold War Began: The Gouzenko Affair and the Hunt for Soviet Spies.
 Lunan, Gordon. 1995. The Making of a Spy: A Political Odyssey.
 McShane, Brendan. 2021 February 21. "It's War. It's War. It's Russia." Canada's History. Canada's National History Society.
 Stevenson, William. 1983. Intrepid’s Last Case.
 Whitaker, Reg. c. 1984-1987. "Spy Scandal." Horizon Canada 10. Brampton, ON: Centre for the Study of Teaching Canada.
 Whitaker, Reg, and Gary Marcuse. 1994. Cold War Canada: The Making of a National Insecurity State, 1945–1957. . 511 pp.
 Whitaker, Reg, and Steve Hewitt. 2003. Canada and the Cold War. Toronto: Lorimer. 256 pp.
 "Cold War Culture: The Nuclear Fear of the 1950s and 1960s," CBC Digital Archives.

External links 

 The Report of the Royal Commission
 "Cold War Canada | Comfort and Fear" – Canada: A People's History, CBC Learning
 Project Rustic: Journey to the Diefenbunker – Diefenbunker Canada’s Cold War Museum, Canadian Heritage. Archived.
 "Gouzenko: The Series" (podcast) – Canada's History, Canada's National History Society
 "Gouzenko Deciphered" (2020 September 8), interview with Evy Wilson, daughter of Igor Gouzenko
 "Gouzenko Deciphered Part 2" (2020 October 7), interview with Calder Walton
 "Gouzenko Deciphered Part 3" (2020 October 21), interview with Andrew Kavchak

Canada–Soviet Union relations
Events of National Historic Significance (Canada)
Cold War history of Canada
History of Canada (1945–1960)
Anti-communism in Canada
1945 in international relations
1945 in Canada